The fourth season of Supernatural, an American dark fantasy  television series created by Eric Kripke, premiered September 18, 2008, and concluded on May 14, 2009, on The CW.

This season focuses on brothers Sam (Jared Padalecki) and Dean Winchester (Jensen Ackles) encountering angels for the first time in their lives as hunters of the supernatural; this marks the introduction of eventual series regular, the angel Castiel (Misha Collins). The angels intervene to rescue Dean from Hell and bring him back to life after he became trapped there in the third season finale "No Rest for the Wicked". They explain that they have arrived on Earth for the first time in thousands of years in order to prevent the demons from freeing the fallen angel Lucifer from Hell, as Lucifer would then cause the Apocalypse. The demons are led by the Winchesters' enemy, and Dean's murderer, Lilith. However, it becomes increasingly clear that something is wrong with Heaven and that the angels have their own agendas. Despite an initially happy reunion, tension grows between Sam and Dean because Dean fears Sam's growing demonic powers and distrusts Sam's returning demonic ally Ruby (Genevieve Cortese).

Cast

Starring
 Jared Padalecki as Sam Winchester
 Jensen Ackles as Dean Winchester

Guest stars

Episodes

In this table, the number in the first column refers to the episode's number within the entire series, whereas the number in the second column indicates the episode's number within that particular season. "U.S. viewers in millions" refers to how many Americans watched the episode live or on the day of broadcast.

Production
The mythology was expanded even more in the fourth season with the introduction of angels. While Kripke originally did not want angels to be featured in the series, he changed his mind when he realized that he needed them in order to have a "cosmic battle" with the many demons. With this concept added into the series' mythology, the writers came to view the show as being "about two greasers and a muscle car, but the canvas that they're on are demons and angels and battles and the apocalypse..." While it was originally intended for the fourth season to feature an "all-out demon war", budget cuts forced the writers to change their plans, making it "smaller, more contained, underground, more guerrilla-style". Kripke feels this ended up benefiting the series, believing the brothers-centric episodes to be more interesting than the "epic" ones of the third season. Thus, the war was depicted in the writers' "scruffy, angsty, Supernatural way" while focusing more on the characters. The writing staff felt that the fourth season's mythology had been the best since the first season.

Reception
The review aggregator website Rotten Tomatoes reported a 100% approval rating for Supernatural's fourth season, with an average rating of 8.7/10 based on 8 reviews. The season received critical acclaim and is widely regarded as one of the show's best seasons.

References

External links

 
 
 

Supernatural 04
2008 American television seasons
2009 American television seasons